Johnny Sellers (July 31, 1937 – July 3, 2010) was an American  National Champion jockey. Born in Los Angeles, but raised in Oklahoma, he began his professional career in 1955 and between 1959 and 1968 rode in six Kentucky Derbys. He won the prestigious race aboard Carry Back in 1961 then riding the colt to victory in the  Preakness Stakes. That same year, he won eight straight races, equaling an American record set in 1951, and ended the year as the United States Champion Jockey by wins. He made the August 28, 1961 cover of Sports Illustrated magazine.

In 1958, Sellers rode Jack Ketch to victory in the Canadian International Stakes and in 1965 he won the Belmont Stakes aboard Hail To All. In 1969 he was voted the George Woolf Memorial Jockey Award.

Retired in 1997, Sellers lived in Hallandale, Florida, two blocks from Gulfstream Park racetrack. He remained involved in the racing industry as a bloodstock agent. In 1999, he was in the news after recovering his Kentucky Derby trophy. Stolen from his Monrovia, California home in 1978, twenty-one years later a friend notified him that the engraved sterling silver trophy was being offered for sale on eBay.

In 2007, Johnny Sellers was elected to the United States' Racing Hall of Fame. In 2011, he was inducted into the Oklahoma Horse Racing Hall of Fame.

Johnny Sellers died on July 3, 2010 at age 72 in Fayetteville, Arkansas. He had two sons, Mark Sellers and John Michael Sellers, both of whom had careers as jockeys. He also had a daughter, Sabrina Sellers Machado.

After finishing seventh at the Belmont Stakes with Carry Back, he was a Mystery Guest on What's My Line with Arlene Francis, Joey Bishop, Dorothy Kilgallen, and Bennett Cerf on the panel. Sellers won $10 for stumping Cerf and Francis; Joey Bishop successfully guessed his identity.

References

1937 births
2010 deaths
American jockeys
American Champion jockeys
United States Thoroughbred Racing Hall of Fame inductees
Sportspeople from Los Angeles
People from Hallandale Beach, Florida
Sportspeople from Oklahoma